"Millions" is a song recorded by South Korean boy group Winner. It was released on December 19, 2018 under the label YG Entertainment and is distributed by Genie Music.

Background and release
On December 11, 2018, YG Entertainment published a group poster with the words "Coming Soon". Two days later, it was revealed that Winner's comeback would consist of a single album that would be released online on December 19. On December 14, it was announced that the single was entitled "Millions" through a poster crediting Kang Seung-yoon, Song Min Ho and Lee Seung Hoon for the lyrics and Kang Seung-yoon, Kang Uk-jin and Diggy for the composition of the song.

Solo posters of the members were released on December 17 and a final poster was published a few hours prior to the release along with a teaser of the music video. The group held an hour-long comeback special live "Merry Millions Day" on Naver's V App on December 19 at 5 PM (KST). The music video was released at 6PM (KST). The making film was published the following day. A performance video with he full choreography was released on December 21.

Composition
Tamar Herman of Billboard describes "Millions" as a "feel-good dance track that brings a summery feel" and that is "fronted by plucky strings, snappy drum beats, and bright whistle synth effects." Woo Jae-yeon of Yonhap News Agency defines it as "a tropical-pop dance song."

Promotion

Winner held their comeback stage on MBC's Show! Music Core on December 22. They promoted the song on several music programs in South Korea, including Inkigayo.

Charts

Awards and nominations

Music program awards

Release history

See also 
 List of M Countdown Chart winners (2018)
 List of M Countdown Chart winners (2019)

References

External links 

 

2018 singles
2018 songs
YG Entertainment singles